Reece Deakin (born 12 December 1996) is a Welsh professional footballer who plays as a forward.

Career
Deakin played youth football for Crystal Palace and spent time with Cray Wanderers, before signing for Conwy Borough in October 2016. He moved to Airbus UK Broughton in January 2017, before turning professional with Morecambe in July 2017. He was released by Morecambe at the end of the 2017–18 season, having made three cup appearances for them.

Career statistics

References

1996 births
Living people
Welsh footballers
Crystal Palace F.C. players
Cray Wanderers F.C. players
Conwy Borough F.C. players
Airbus UK Broughton F.C. players
Morecambe F.C. players
Association football forwards
Cymru Premier players